Paya Jaras is a town in Selangor, Malaysia. The first village head to open the village of Paya Jaras was Baie bin Duawan, of Malay descent from Padang, Indonesia who came to Malaysia around the early 20s. Remembering his sacrifice and service, one road bears his name, Haji Baie Road, located in Kampung Paya Jaras Hulu which consists of four villages: Kampung Paya Jaras Dalam, Kampung Paya Jaras Tengah, Kampung Paya Jaras Hulu and Kampung Paya Jaras Hilir.

Paya Jaras has a mix of traditional villages and a new village, as well as a number of residential areas. The middle to upper-class areas are Bukit Rahman Putra, Sierramas and Valencia, while the middle-class areas include Aman Puri and Taman Sri Buloh. The lower-income residents are found in Aman Puri and Matang Jaya.

References
 Straight fights in all Subang constituencies, The Star, March 7, 2008.

Populated places in Selangor
Towns in Selangor